Giverny is a commune in the northern French department of Eure. The village is located on the "right bank" of the river Seine at its confluence with the river Epte. It is best known as the location of Claude Monet's garden and home.

Several American Impressionist artists also settled in Giverny, drawn by the landscapes, the overall atmosphere, and the presence of Monet. Other attractions include the Museum of Impressionism Giverny, dedicated to the history of impressionism and the Giverny art colony, and the Hôtel Baudy, which was the center of artistic life in Giverny's heyday. It is now a café and restaurant, with period decoration.

History

A settlement has existed in Giverny since neolithic times and a monument uncovered attests to this fact. Archeological finds have included bootees dating from Gallo-Roman times and to the earlier 1st and 2nd centuries AD. The town was known in ancient deeds as "Warnacum". The cultivation of grapes has been an occupation of the inhabitants of Giverny since Merovingian times.

The village church dates from the Middle Ages and is built partially in the Romanesque style, though additions have since been made. It is dedicated to Sainte-Radegonde. The village has remained a small rural setting with a modest population (numbering around 301 in 1883 when Monet discovered it) and has since seen a boom in tourism since the restoration of Monet's house and gardens.

Monet at Giverny

Claude Monet noticed the village of Giverny while looking out of a train window. He made up his mind to move there and rented a house and the area surrounding it. In 1890 he had enough money to buy the house and land outright and set out to create the magnificent gardens he wanted to paint.

Some of his most famous paintings were of his garden in Giverny, famous for its rectangular Clos Normand, with archways of climbing plants entwined around colored shrubs, and the water garden, formed by a tributary to the Epte, with the Japanese bridge, the pond with the water lilies, the wisterias and the azaleas.

The Giverny Colony 

Beginning around 1887, several American Impressionist artists settled to work in Giverny, drawn by the landscapes, the overall atmosphere, and the presence of Monet. These included Willard Metcalf, Louis Ritman, Theodore Wendel, and John Leslie Breck.  Soon many American extended their visits from summer through the entire year.  American painter Theodore Earl Butler married Monet's stepdaughter and sometime-model Suzanne Hoschedé there in 1892.

Frederick Carl Frieseke spent every summer from 1906 through 1919 in a residence next door to Monet's.  The term Decorative Impressionism was coined in 1911 to describe Frieseke's work, and the term describes the work of a "second wave" of American painters in Giverny such as Richard E. Miller.  In December 1910, six of the Giverny artists (Frieseke, Miller, Lawton S. Parker, Guy Rose, Edmund Greacen and Karl Anderson) were given a show at the Madison Gallery in New York which termed them "The Giverny Group."

The First World War largely marked the end of the art colony.

Attractions

Claude Monet's property at Giverny (house and gardens), left by his son to the Académie des Beaux-Arts in 1966, became a Museum opened to public visit in 1980 after completion of large-scale restoration work: the huge Nymphea's studio was restored and the precious collection of Japanese woodblock prints was displayed in several rooms, hung in the manner chosen by the master himself; the gardens were replanted as they once were.  The house became a popular tourist attraction (the Claude Monet Foundation), particularly in the summer when the flowers are in bloom.

The other main attraction of the village is the Museum of Impressionism Giverny, dedicated to the history of impressionism and its continuation in the Giverny art colony and along the valley of the River Seine.

The Hôtel Baudy was a center of artistic life in the Giverny heyday. It is now still a café and restaurant, with period decoration.

See also
Communes of Eure

References

Bibliography
 Katherine M. Bourguignon (ed), Impressionist Giverny. A Colony of Artists, 1885-1915 (Giverny: Terra Foundation for American Art, 2007).

External links

 Giverny
 Giverny 

Communes of Eure
Gardens in Eure
Houses in France
Landscape design history
Museums in Eure